Jonava District Municipality is one of 60 municipalities in Lithuania.

Structure 
District structure:   
 1 city – Jonava;
 3 towns – Panoteriai, Rukla and Žeimiai;
 277 villages.
 9 elderships - Bukonys Eldership, Jonava City Eldership, Kulva Eldership, Rukla Eldership, Šilai Eldership, Šveicarija Eldership, Upninkai Eldership, Užusaliai Eldership, Žeimiai Eldership.
  
Biggest population (2001):   
 Jonava – 34954
 Rukla – 2376
 Upninkai – 1019
 Žeimiai – 962
 Šveicarija – 848
 Užusaliai – 844
 Bukonys – 657
 Kuigaliai – 455
 Šilai – 441
 Išorai – 437

Elderships 
Jonava District Municipality is divided into 9 elderships:

Schools 
 Barupės pagrindinė mokykla
 Batėgalos pagrindinė mokykla
 Bukonių pagrindinė mokykla
 Janina Miščiukaitė School of Art
 Jonavos Jeronimo Ralio vidurinė mokykla
 Jonavos Justino Vareikio pagrindinė mokykla
 Jonavos Lietavos pagrindinė mokykla
 Jonavos Neries pagrindinė mokykla
 Jonavos Raimundo Samulevičiaus pagrindinė mokykla
 Jonavos Santarvės vidurinė mokykla
 Jonavos Senamiesčio gimnazija
 Kulvos Abraomo Kulviečio pagrindinė mokykla
 Panoterių Petro Vaičiūno pagrindinė mokykla
 Ruklos Jono Stanislausko vidurinė mokykla
 Šveicarijos pagrindinė mokykla
 Upninkų pagrindinė mokykla
 Užusalių pagrindinė mokykla
 Viešoji įstaiga Jonavos suaugusiųjų švietimo centras
 Žeimių vidurinė mokykla

References

External links 
Official webpage

 
Municipalities of Kaunas County
Municipalities of Lithuania